Claudine Trécourt (born 1962) is a French ski mountaineer, high mountain guide and mountain climber. She currently teaches physics and sports. In May 2007 she also took part in an expedition on the Cho Oyu.

Selected results

Ski mountaineering 
 1991:
 1st, Matterhorn ski marathon, Zermatt
 1997:
 1st, French national ranking
 1998:
 1st, French national ranking
 1st, Tour du Rutor (together with Alexia Zuberer)
 2nd, Patrouille des Glaciers (together with Alexia Zuberer and Jana Heczková)
 1999:
 1st, French national ranking

Pierra Menta 
 1988: 1st, together with her sister, Sylvie Trécourt
 1989: 1st, together with Sylvie Trécourt
 1990: 1st, together with Sylvie Trécourt
 1991: 1st, together with Sylvie Trécourt
 1992: 2nd, together with Sylvie Trécourt
 1994: 1st, together with Sylvie Trécourt
 1995: 2nd, together with Sylvie Trécourt
 1997: 1st, together with Alexia Zuberer
 1998: 1st, together with Alexia Zuberer
 1999: 1st, together with Danièle Hacquard

Climbing 
 1991:
 2nd, French Championship, Briançon

References 

1962 births
Living people
French female ski mountaineers
French mountain climbers
French schoolteachers
Female climbers
20th-century French women